Richard Champion (born 14 April 1968 on Yorke Peninsula in Kadina, South Australia) is a former Australian rules footballer in the Australian Football League (AFL) and South Australian National Football Leagues (SANFL).

Originally from SANFL club Woodville, Champion was a high draft pick by the Brisbane Bears in 1988 VFL Draft, but he did not move to Brisbane until the 1991 AFL season.

A solidly built and tough backman, Champion wore the number 1 guernsey for Brisbane and was a Bears stalwart through some of the club's darkest years, and he was a poster player in an era when the club had so few.

When the club moved from Carrara on the Gold Coast, growing their fanbase, Champion became a cult figure. He was endeared by Bears fans, was Best Clubman several times, and became a local celebrity with his Jimmy Barnes impressions. He was a media figure for the club. He even appeared with John Platten to represent the AFL on the television show Gladiators.

When it became apparent that the Bears would make the finals for the first time in 1995, Champion openly wept, a sign of his endurance as a player through tough times.

Champion competed in the Gladiator Team Sports Challenge in 1995.

He retired at the end of the 2000 AFL season after 183 AFL games.

Post-football career

Champion is currently a television presenter and radio commentator in Brisbane and a local celebrity. He has presented TV’s The Great South East, the Lotto draw, and commentates the AFL for Triple M. 
In 2006, he appeared in the television show It Takes Two, where he was mentored by Wendy Matthews.

In additional to multiple singing performances on The Footy Show, Champion went on to front the classic rock supergroup The Filthy Animals after it was formed in 2021 during the COVID-19 pandemic. The band usually plays cover songs at corporate gigs; the band often features, among many others, Kerry Jacobson (Dragon, Mondo Rock, Ian Moss), Brett Williams (The Choirboys), and Glen Muirhead (Eurogliders, James Reyne Band).

References

External links

1968 births
Living people
Australian rules football commentators
Brisbane Bears players
Brisbane Lions players
Woodville Football Club players
Australian rules footballers from South Australia